Kyle Irion is an American blogger and writer of fiction. Irion is a graduate of the University of North Texas, where he received a B.A. in English. Irion writes a blog, Iron Kyle, which is regularly updated with satirical flash fiction. He also writes for the online journal Whiskey Round Table, which, according to Patrick O. Strickland, Irion and Strickland started Whiskey Round Table together in 2010. Kyle was born and raised in Waxahachie, Texas, but resides in San Marcos, Texas, where he attends Texas State University, working on an M.A. in Literature. He is working on a satirical novel which is expected, according to a former post on Iron Kyle, to be finished late 2011 or early 2012.

Irion claims that his greatest writing influence and favorite author is Cormac McCarthy.

Irion has defended popular commercial literature, in a Whiskey Round Table essay titled "Why the Literary Community Needs 'Twilight'", stating that "I am in no way arguing an equality in quality of New Moon to The Great Gatsby. That doesn’t matter. Nor am I equating commercial success with creative depth. From what I understand from the Wikipedia articles on these books, their plots are simple and predictable, and their characters relatively flat and derivative. But there was something about the books that made people want to read. There was something in those books that made a lot of people want to read. In a time when attention spans are getting shorter and shorter and the number of children who read for recreation plummeting with all the delicateness of a bowling ball tied to an eighteen wheeler, I think we should all be thankful for something–no matter how silly it may seem–that keeps young–and maybe not so young–people in libraries, in bookstores, and in the infinite universe of their own imagination."

He has had short fiction published by Paper Darts, This Great Society, Whiskey Round Table], and Fiction Daily.

Irion also played guitar and back up vocals for Roy Robertson, a musician based out of Denton, Texas.

Publications
 "Every Show Needs an Audience," This Great Society, July/August 2011.
 "Hard Water," This Great Society, September 2011.
 "Coffin Shopping," Paper Darts, 2010.
 "Untitled," Fiction Daily, July 2011. (This is a one sentence short story.)
 "Real Inspiration," Now Magazine, February 2010.

References 

Year of birth missing (living people)
Living people
University of North Texas alumni
American bloggers
People from Waxahachie, Texas